Events in the year 1919 in Portugal.

Incumbents
President: João do Canto e Castro; António José de Almeida
Prime Minister: João Tamagnini de Sousa Barbosa; José Relvas; Domingos Leite Pereira; Alfredo de Sá Cardoso

Events
11 May – Portuguese legislative election, 1919.
Establishment of the Republican Liberal Party.
Disestablishment of the Evolutionist Party and Republican Union political parties.

Arts and entertainment

Sports

Births

6 November – Sophia de Mello Breyner Andresen, poet (died 2004).

Deaths

References

 
1910s in Portugal
Portugal
Years of the 20th century in Portugal
Portugal